Gekko athymus, also known as the Brown's gecko or smooth-scaled narrow-disked gecko, is a species of gecko. The species is endemic to the island of Palawan in the Philippines.  It is a rare, crepuscular animal that has only been found in intact primary forest.

References 

Gekko
Reptiles described in 1962
Reptiles of the Philippines
Endemic fauna of the Philippines
Fauna of Palawan